Craig Russell Matthews (born 15 February 1965 is a former South African cricketer who played in 18 Test matches and 56 One Day Internationals between 1991 and 1997.

Matthews was born in Cape Town, Cape Province, and attended Pinelands High School.

References

1965 births
Living people
South Africa Test cricketers
South Africa One Day International cricketers
South African cricketers
Cricketers at the 1996 Cricket World Cup
Western Province cricketers
Cricketers from Cape Town